Zelenodol is a village in Blagoevgrad Municipality, Blagoevgrad Province, Bulgaria. It is situated on the right bank of Struma river 5 kilometers west from Blagoevgrad on the road to Delčevo in North Macedonia.

References

Villages in Blagoevgrad Province